Aleksei Konstantinovich Maklakov (born 6 January 1962 in Novosibirsk) is a Soviet and Russian actor and singer. Well known in Russia for his starring role as Praporshchik Shmatko on the REN TV series Soldiers.

Filmography

References

External links

1962 births
Living people
Actors from Novosibirsk
Soviet male actors
Soviet male stage actors
Russian male actors
Russian male film actors
Russian male television actors
Russian male stage actors
20th-century Russian male actors
21st-century Russian male actors